The men's 60 metres event at the 2023 European Athletics Indoor Championships will be held on 4 March 2023 at 09:20 (heats), at 18:45 (semi-finals)  and at 20:55 (final) local time.

Medalists

Records

Results

Heats
Qualification: First 4 in each heat (Q) and the next 4 fastest (q) advance to the Semifinals.

Semifinals
Qualification: First 2 in each heat (Q) and the next 2 fastest (q) advance to the Final.

Final

References

2023 European Athletics Indoor Championships
60 metres at the European Athletics Indoor Championships